The "Solidaritätslied" ("Solidarity Song") is a revolutionary working song written between 1929 and 1931 by Bertolt Brecht, and set to music by Hanns Eisler. It was written against the background of the Great Depression, the Great War (1914–18), and the social issues caused by the Industrial Revolution that were explored in Brecht's 1932 film Kuhle Wampe in which the song also appeared.

History 

Two versions of the text exist, both written by Brecht. The better known version is the second, written during the Spanish Civil War, which is more abstract and ideological. The first version is more closely tied to the film Kuhle Wampe.

In 1932, the song was first performed with the collaboration of several working-men's choirs. The song spread quickly in the final months of the Weimar Republic, particularly at sporting events.

Structure and score 
The  begins with the following verse:
{|
|
|style="padding-left:2em;"|Come out of your hole
that one calls accommodation,
and after a grey week
follows a red weekend.
|}

In Eisler's arrangement, the first four syllables of the word "Solidarity" are repeated on the same pitch (a "D" above a subdominant G minor chord), while the final syllable is sung one semitone (half step) lower, a C over a dominant A major chord. The final four bars of the song repeat this chord change, ending on the dominant instead of the more natural return to the tonic, leaving the end of the song open, both musically and textually:
{|
|
|style="padding-left:2em;"|Whose morning is the morning,
whose world is the world?
|}

The melody follows the BACH motif. The four notes are heard in the bars 1, 2, 5, and 6; the "D" and "C" in bars 9 and 10 continue the sequence.

Versions 
The text has been translated into multiple languages. The best known version was performed by Ernst Busch, who also appeared in Kuhle Wampe.

In 1961, a group of noted East German composers produced the joint composition  ("Orchestral variations of Eisler's Solidarity Song"). Among these were Andre Asriel, Fritz Geißler, Herbert Kirmße, Günter Kochan, Siegfried Köhler, Joachim Werzlau and Ruth Zechlin, some of whom were students of Eisler.

Frederic Rzewski's 1975 composition for piano The People United Will Never Be Defeated! cites the "Solidaritätslied" at Variation 26.

The final two bars were used as an interval signal by the East German broadcaster .

See also 
 Einheitsfrontlied

References

External links 
 
 Text of the "Solidaritätslied"
 Hanns Eisler: Music: A Virtual Tour – Complete recording of the "Solidaritätslied" with Ernst Busch (RealAudio-file under "Creative partnership with Bertolt Brecht")

Political songs
Songs with lyrics by Bertolt Brecht
Compositions by Hanns Eisler
1931 songs